Jackie Tileston (born 1960, Manila, Philippines) is an American artist and painter. She is associate professor of fine arts in the School of Design at The University of Pennsylvania. She is the recipient of the 2006 John Simon Guggenheim Memorial Foundation Fellowship in painting and the 2004 Pew Fellowship in the Arts.

References 

1960 births
Living people
American artists
People from Manila
University of Pennsylvania faculty
Pew Fellows in the Arts
Filipino emigrants to the United States